Petros Mitzou or Mitsou (Greek: Πέτρος Μήτζου, Γεώργιος Μήτσου) was a Greek revolutionary leader during the Greek War of Independence.

He was descended from an old military family.  He fought at Chlemoutsi against the Turks.

In July 1825 he was assassinated by Dionysis Diakos.

See also
Georgios Mitzou

References

1825 deaths
People from Pyrgos, Elis
Greek military leaders of the Greek War of Independence
Year of birth unknown